Iain Sprangach MacDonald (died 1340) was a younger son of Angus Mor of Islay, and founder of Clan MacDonald of Ardnamurchan.

References

1340 deaths
Iain Sprangach
Medieval Gaels from Scotland
14th-century Scottish people
Year of birth unknown